Élise Fajgeles (born 6 July 1970) is a French politician who served as the member of the National Assembly for the 5th constituency of Paris from 2017 to 2019. A member of La République En Marche! (LREM), she replaced Benjamin Griveaux as his substitute upon his appointment as Secretary of State to the Minister of the Economy and Finance. Griveaux returned to Parliament two years later after stepping down from his Government Spokesman position.

Early life 
Fajgeles was born in Sartrouville, Yvelines. Her grandparents were Polish Jews.

Political career 
At the 2017 French legislative election, Fajgeles was the substitute candidate for Benjamin Griveaux in Paris's 5th constituency. Fajgeles became a member of the National Assembly following Griveaux's appointment to the government as Secretary of State to the Minister of the Economy and Finance on 22 July 2017. She left Parliament in 2019.

References

External links 
 Official website

1970 births
Living people
People from Yvelines
Politicians from Paris
Jewish French politicians
French people of Polish-Jewish descent
21st-century French women politicians
Women members of the National Assembly (France)
Deputies of the 15th National Assembly of the French Fifth Republic
La République En Marche! politicians
Members of Parliament for Paris